The 2002 Big Ten Conference football season was the 107th season for the Big Ten Conference.

Rankings

Bowl games

See also
 2002 All-Big Ten Conference football team

References